I'm Your Woman may refer to:
 I'm Your Woman (album), an album by Sandra Bernhard
 I'm Your Woman (film), a 2020 drama film by Julia Hart
 "I'm Your Woman" (song), a single by Jeanne Pruett

See also
 "I Am Your Woman", a single by Syleena Johnson